"She Drew a Broken Heart" is a song written by Jon McElroy and Ned McElroy, and recorded by American country music artist Patty Loveless. It was released in December 1996 as the fourth single from her eight album, The Trouble with the Truth (1996). The song charted for 20 weeks on the US Billboard Hot Country Singles and Tracks chart, reaching number four during the week of March 15, 1997.

Critical reception
Deborah Evans Price from Billboard described "She Drew a Broken Heart" as "a feisty uptempo tune about a woman whose goodbye note is written in lipstick on her ex-lover's satin sheets." She added, "Laced with fiddle and buoyed by the sass in Loveless' vocals, this is an extremely strong offering that should find instant acceptance at country radio."

Charts

Weekly charts

Year-end charts

References

1996 singles
1995 songs
Patty Loveless songs
Song recordings produced by Emory Gordy Jr.
Epic Records singles